Sarada is a 1962 Indian Tamil-language drama film written and directed by K. S. Gopalakrishnan in his directorial debut. The film was produced by A. L. Srinivasan under ALS Productions and stars S. S. Rajendran and C. R. Vijayakumari, while M. R. Radha, S. V. Ranga Rao and S. A. Ashokan play supporting roles. The music was composed by K. V. Mahadevan, while the lyrics for the songs were written by Kannadasan. Karnan and R. Devarajan handled cinematography and editing respectively.

Sarada was released on 16 March 1962. Srinivasan had to distribute the film himself after distributors backed out. Despite this, it became successful at the box office established Gopalakrishnan as a popular director. The film was remade in Hindi as Suhagan (1964), in Telugu as Sumangali (1965) and in Kannada as Sothu Geddavalu (1971).

Plot

Cast 
S. S. Rajendran as Sambandham
C. R. Vijayakumari as Sarada
Pushpalatha as Uma
M. R. Radha as Panchanathan
S. V. Ranga Rao as Vaiyapuripillai
 M. V. Rajamma as Sambandham's mother
Geetanjali as Panchanathan's third wife
V. Nagayya as College principal
S. V. Sahasranamam as College principal
S. A. Ashokan as Shankar
Karikol Raju as Panchanathan's labourer
 N. R. Sandhiya as Sarada's mother
S. Rama Rao as Panchanathan's son

Production 
K. S. Gopalakrishnan—who earlier worked as a screenwriter for films like Deivapiravi and Padikkadha Medhai—made his directorial debut with Sarada. He approached A. L. Srinivasan to produce the film based on the concept of the protagonist's sexual potency. Srinivasan liked the script and agreed to produce despite being warned by friends not to produce a film with such a bold concept.

Soundtrack 
The soundtrack was composed by K. V. Mahadevan and lyrics were written by Kannadasan and Panchu Arunachalam. The songs "Manamagale Marumagale" and "Oruthi Oruvanai" were well received. The former is Arunachalam's first song as a lyricist.

Release 
Sarada was released on 16 March 1962. Film distributors expressed their doubts over the film after watching it and sought refund of their advances. Srinivasan returned the advance and released the film on his own and became successful. The film was successful even its second release.

Reception 
The film was praised by critics for Gopalakrishnan's writing, the cast performances (particularly Vijayakumari's) and music. Ananda Vikatan appreciated the film stating that "the film had several interesting elements and innovations.. It is a must watch film and make us all proud that Tamil films are progressing well". Kanthan of Kalki wrote that though the film reminded him of Nenjil Or Aalayam (1962), the innovative screenplay made it worth watching. The film received National Film Award for Best Feature Film in Tamil – Certificate of Merit for the Third Best Feature Film.

Plagiarism allegations 
Many reviewers noted Sarada had similarities to Snehidhi, a novel by Akilan. Subsequently, he filed a lawsuit against Srinivasan, alleging plagiarism. Writer Jayalakshmi also sued Srinivasan, claiming the film plagiarised one of her short stories. However, as historian A. R. Venkatachalapathy noted, "the legal intricacies of copyright, it appears, were beyond both the writer's and his lawyer's grasp", leading to Akilan losing the case while Jayalakshmi won. She was compensated by being "awarded more damages than claimed", and the scenes she took offense to were deleted.

Legacy 
Sarada established Gopalakrishnan as a popular director and he went on to direct several films with the theme of family drama. It was remade in Hindi as Suhagan (1964), in Telugu as Sumangali (1965) and in Kannada as Sothu Geddavalu (1971).

References

Bibliography

External links 
 

1960s Tamil-language films
1962 directorial debut films
1962 drama films
1962 films
Films directed by K. S. Gopalakrishnan
Films involved in plagiarism controversies
Films scored by K. V. Mahadevan
Films with screenplays by K. S. Gopalakrishnan
Indian black-and-white films
Indian drama films
Tamil films remade in other languages